Karel Neffe (born 21 February 1985 in Prague) is a Czech rower. He finished 5th in the men's coxless four at the 2008 Summer Olympics. His father Karel Neffe was a crew member of the Czechoslovak boat which won the bronze medal in the 1972 coxed four event.

 World Rowing Junior Championships – 2002 champion in JM 8
 World Rowing Junior Championships – 2003 silver medalist in JM 4-
 World Rowing U23 Championships – 2006 champion in JMB 4- (world-best time)
 European Rowing Championships – 2007 champion in M4-

References

External links 
 
 

1985 births
Living people
Czech male rowers
Rowers from Prague
Olympic rowers of the Czech Republic
Rowers at the 2004 Summer Olympics
Rowers at the 2008 Summer Olympics
European Rowing Championships medalists